HD 70930 is a binary star system in the southern constellation of Vela. It has the Bayer designation B Velorum, while HD 70930 is the star's identifier in the Henry Draper catalogue. With a combined apparent visual magnitude of 4.79, it is visible to the naked eye as a faint point of light. The distance to this system is approximately 1,700 light years based on parallax, and it has an absolute magnitude of −3.74. It is drifting further away from the Sun with a radial velocity of about +27 km/s. The system is a member of the Vel OB2 association of co-moving stars.

The double nature of this system was discovered in 1896 by Scottish astronomer Robert T. A. Innes – it is now known to be a double-lined spectroscopic binary. The magnitude 5.14 primary component has a blue-white hue and has been assigned stellar classifications of B1V and B2III, matching a B-type main-sequence star or a giant star, respectively. It is a massive object – over 15 times the mass of the Sun – and is around 10 million years old. The star has a high rate of spin, showing a projected rotational velocity of 169 km/s. Its companion, at magnitude +6.08, is located at an angular separation of  along a position angle of 139°, as of 2008.

References

B-type giants
B-type main-sequence stars
Spectroscopic binaries

Vela (constellation)
Velorum, B
Durchmusterung objects
070930
041039
3294